The Skelton Dam is an embankment dam on the Saco River between the towns of Buxton and Dayton in York County, Maine. The dam was completed in 1948 with the primary purpose of hydroelectric power generation. The largest fish lift in Maine was completed on the dam in 2001. The dam and facilities are owned by Brookfield Renewable.

References

Dams in Maine
Hydroelectric power plants in Maine
Dams completed in 1948
Energy infrastructure completed in 1948
Saco River
United States power company dams
Buildings and structures in York County, Maine
Buxton, Maine
Dams with fish ladders